Middle age is the period of a human's life beyond young adulthood but before the onset of old age. The exact range is subject to academic debate, but commonly the term is used to denote the age range from around 40 to 60, although it may begin earlier and end later. This phase of life is marked by gradual physical, cognitive, and social decline in individuals as they age.

Middle adulthood
This time span is generally referred to as "middle age" and can be defined as the time of ages about 40+ to about 60+, depending also on sexes. Many changes may occur between young adulthood and this stage.  Some definitions start later, at around age 45, such as those of Merriam-Webster and the Oxford English Dictionary. Some start as late as age 50. There is no universal consensus on what the exact definition of middle age is, but usual characteristics include the beginning of rapid decline of fertility, graying of hair, and lessening of opportunities. The American Psychological Association defines "middle adulthood" as beginning at 35 or 36, and many ranges do not end until 60 or 65. The Lancet considers midlife as starting from around age 40. Modern social scientists generally agree that midlife begins around 35 to 40 and ends around 55 to 60.

The body may slow down and the middle aged might become more sensitive to diet, substance abuse, stress, and rest. Chronic health problems can become issues along with disability or disease. Emotional responses and retrospection vary from person to person; for example, senses of mortality, sadness, or loss are common emotions at this age.

Those in middle adulthood or middle age continue to develop relationships and adapt to changes in relationships. Such changes are highly evident in the maturing relationships between growing or grown children and aging parents. Community involvement is fairly typical of this stage of adulthood, as is continued career development.

Physical characteristics
Middle-aged adults may begin to show visible signs of aging. This process can be more rapid in women who have osteoporosis. Changes might occur in the nervous system. The ability to perform complex tasks remains intact. During the years surrounding the age of 51, women experience menopause, which ends natural fertility. Menopause can have many side effects. Changes can occur to skin, and other changes may include a decline in physical fitness, including a reduction in aerobic performance, a decrease in maximal heart rate, and graying and loss of hair. Sensory sensitivity in middle-aged adults has been shown to be one of the lowest. These measurements are generalities, and people may exhibit changes at different rates and times.

Mortality rates can begin to increase from 50 onward, due mainly to health issues like heart problems, cancer, hypertension, and diabetes.
Still, the majority of middle-aged people in industrialized nations can expect to live into old age.

Starting around age 35, pregnant women are considered to be of advanced maternal age, and significant declines in fertility begin to occur that usually end with menopause around age 50. The normal range for menopause is 45 to 55.

Cognitive
Erik Erikson refers to this period of adulthood as generativity versus stagnation, the seventh of eight stages of Erikson's stages of psychosocial development. People in middle adulthood or middle age may experience some cognitive loss, which usually remains unnoticeable because life experiences and strategies get developed to compensate for any decrease in mental abilities.

During this stage, adults often strive to have things that will outlast them. Generativity, which is the concern and the commitment middle-aged people have for  future generations, is a big part of development during this stage.

Social and personality characteristics
For some, marital satisfaction remains intact, but other family relationships can become more difficult. Career satisfaction focuses more on inner satisfaction and contentedness and less on ambition and the desire to advance. Even so, career changes occur often. Middle adulthood or middle age can be a time when people reexamine their lives by taking stock and evaluating their accomplishments. Morality may change and become more conscious. The perception that those in this stage of development of life undergo a so-called midlife crisis is a largely false one. Personality characteristics remain stable throughout this period, and relationships in middle adulthood may continue to evolve into connections that are stable.

See also
Youth
Aging
Midlife crisis

References

External links

Further reading
 
Lachman, M. E. (Ed.). (2001). Handbook of midlife development. NY: John Wiley.
Lachman, M. E., Salom, T., & Agrigoroaei, S. (2015). Midlife as a pivotal period in the life course: Balancing growth and decline at the crossroads of youth and old age. International Journal of Behavioral Development, 39. 20–31. doi: 10.1177/0165025414533223

 
Human development
Human life stages